The 1983 NBA playoffs was the postseason tournament of the National Basketball Association's 1982–83 season. This was the final postseason using the 12-team format and this is the final postseason held of best of 3 series in first round, before the NBA expanded the postseason to 16 teams and first round expanded of best of 5 series the next season. The tournament concluded with the Eastern Conference champion Philadelphia 76ers defeating the defending NBA champion and Western Conference champion Los Angeles Lakers 4 games to 0 in the NBA Finals. Moses Malone was named NBA Finals MVP.

Malone made a famous prediction about the Sixers' chances prior to the playoffs, saying "Fo', fo', fo'" – predicting the number of games the Sixers would need to win each of the three series they would play on the way to a championship. They nearly accomplished this prediction of a sweep of all three rounds, only losing one game (to Milwaukee in the Eastern Conference Finals) en route to the championship. The Sixers set a record for highest winning percentage in the playoffs that was not broken until the Lakers went 15–1 in 2001. The Lakers' mark, however, came after the expansion to the current 16-team, four-round playoff format, which was first implemented in the 1984 playoffs, while the Sixers avoided the first round by virtue of their top seeding.

It was the third time in four years that the Lakers and 76ers had met in the NBA Finals, with the Lakers winning the previous two series.

After missing the playoffs the previous year, the Blazers began a string of 21 straight playoff appearances in 1983 lasting until 2003. They made the playoffs 25 out of 26 years from their title-winning season of 1977–2003. The record was just one season shy of the 22-year playoff run set by the Syracuse Nationals/Philadelphia 76ers from 1950–1971.

The Celtics were swept out of the playoffs for the first time in team history, losing 4–0 to the Bucks in the second round.

This was the Spurs' last appearance in the Conference Finals until 1995. However, for players such as George Gervin and Artis Gilmore, the 6-game loss to the Lakers was the last chance they got at reaching the NBA Finals, let alone an NBA Championship (Gilmore did return to the conference finals with the Celtics in 1988, but played sparingly).

Bracket

First round

Eastern Conference first round

(3) Boston Celtics vs. (6) Atlanta Hawks

 In the decisive Game 3, Hawks center Tree Rollins and Celtics guard Danny Ainge started a melee on the Boston Garden floor in which Rollins bit Ainge's finger.

This was the seventh playoff meeting between these two teams, with the Celtics winning five of the first six meetings.

(4) New Jersey Nets vs. (5) New York Knicks

This was the first playoff meeting between the Nets and the Knicks.

Western Conference first round

(3) Phoenix Suns vs. (6) Denver Nuggets

 Mike Evans hits the game-tying 3-pointer with 37 seconds left to force OT.

This was the second playoff meeting between these two teams, with the Suns winning the first meeting.

(4) Seattle SuperSonics vs. (5) Portland Trail Blazers

This was the third playoff meeting between these two teams, with the SuperSonics winning the first two meetings.

Conference semifinals

Eastern Conference semifinals

(1) Philadelphia 76ers vs. (5) New York Knicks

This was the eighth playoff meeting between these two teams, with the 76ers winning five of the first seven meetings.

(2) Milwaukee Bucks vs. (3) Boston Celtics

 First time the Celtics were swept in a playoff series since 1954.

This was the second playoff meeting between these two teams, with the Celtics winning the first meeting.

Western Conference semifinals

(1) Los Angeles Lakers vs. (5) Portland Trail Blazers

This was the second playoff meeting between these two teams, with the Trail Blazers winning the first meeting.

(2) San Antonio Spurs vs. (6) Denver Nuggets

This was the first playoff meeting between the Nuggets and the Spurs.

Conference finals

Eastern Conference finals

(1) Philadelphia 76ers vs. (2) Milwaukee Bucks

 Junior Bridgeman hits the game-tying shot with 42 seconds left to force OT.

This was the fourth playoff meeting between these two teams, with the 76ers winning two of the first three meetings.

Western Conference finals

(1) Los Angeles Lakers vs. (2) San Antonio Spurs

This was the second playoff meeting between these two teams, with the Lakers winning the first meeting.

NBA Finals: (E1) Philadelphia 76ers vs. (W1) Los Angeles Lakers

This was the fifth playoff meeting between these two teams, with the Lakers winning the first four meetings.

References

External links
Basketball-Reference.com's 1983 NBA Playoffs page

National Basketball Association playoffs
Playoffs
Sports in Portland, Oregon

fi:NBA-kausi 1982–1983#Pudotuspelit